Olli Heinonen (born 7 January 1937) is a Finnish footballer. He played in 28 matches for the Finland national football team from 1957 to 1965. He played for Ilves-Kissat and Reipas Lahti. He was Finnish Footballer of the Year twice in 1961 and 1963.

References

External links
 

1937 births
Living people
Finnish footballers
Finland international footballers
Place of birth missing (living people)
Association footballers not categorized by position
20th-century Finnish people